Mélusine Mayance (born 21 March 1999 in Paris) is a French actress.

She is best known for her role in the 2010 French-Language film Sarah's Key, in which she portrayed the childhood version of the story's main character 'Sarah Starzynski' (whose life story is uncovered and told by Kristin Scott Thomas's character many decades after the end of the second world war). Known in French as Elle s'appelait Sarah, the historical fiction film is set in 1942 France, in the midst of the second world war. Mélusine's character is a young Jewish child whose family is rounded up and arrested in downtown Paris during the Vel' d'Hiv Roundup before being sent to Auschwitz for extermination. Mayance rose to success while starring in films such as Vive Les Vacances! and Ricky in which she plays the half-sister of an infant boy who grows a pair of wings.

Filmography 
 2009 : Vive les vacances ! (TV) : Alice
 2009 : Ricky, by François Ozon : Lisa
 2009 : Les associés (TV) : Émilie
 2010 : La peau de chagrin (TV), by Alain Berliner : La Mendiante
 2010 : Elle s'appelait Sarah, by Gilles Paquet-Brenner : Sarah Starzynski
 2010 : Un soupçon d'innocence (TV), by director Olivier Péray : Julie
 2011 : Bouquet final (TV), by Josée Dayan : Charlotte
 2013 : Les gamins : Mimi Zozo
 2013 : Michael Kohlhaas :  Lisbeth
 2013 : Brotherhood of Tears : Juliette Chevalier
 2014 : Ça va passer... Mais quand? (TV film) : Paola

References

External links 

Living people
French child actresses
French film actresses
French television actresses
1999 births